Jean Paul Jesús Pineda Cortés (born 24 February 1989) is a Chilean footballer who currently plays for Unión San Felipe as a striker.

Club career
Born in Santiago, Pineda joined CD Palestino's youth setup at the age of 12, and made his senior debuts in 2006. In December 2009 he moved to Cobresal, being the club's top goalscorer during with 11 goals.

On 22 December 2010 Pineda joined Cobreloa, but signed for Unión Española on 16 July of the following year. On 25 January 2013 he returned to Cobresal, after having a short spell at Colo Colo.

On 10 January 2014 Pineda signed for Rangers de Talca. On 25 May, after appearing regularly, he moved to Unión La Calera, scoring a career-best 17 goals for the latter during the 2014–15 campaign.

On 11 July 2015 Pineda moved abroad for the first time in his career, after agreeing to a two-year contract with Spanish Segunda División side Córdoba CF. On 30 August of the following year, he rescinded his link.

In January 2017, Pineda signed contract with Brazilian side EC Vitória.

International career
After previously representing Chile in the under-20 level, Pineda made his debut with the main squad on 16 May 2007, starting in a 2–0 win against Cuba.

Honours
Vitória
 Campeonato Baiano: 2017

Santiago Wanderers
 Copa Chile: 2017

References

External links

1989 births
Living people
Footballers from Santiago
Chilean footballers
Chile under-20 international footballers
Chile international footballers
Chilean expatriate footballers
Association football forwards
Club Deportivo Palestino footballers
Cobresal footballers
Cobreloa footballers
Unión Española footballers
Colo-Colo footballers
Rangers de Talca footballers
Unión La Calera footballers
Córdoba CF players
Esporte Clube Vitória players
Santiago Wanderers footballers
Universidad de Concepción footballers
Coquimbo Unido footballers
Atlético Bucaramanga footballers
Chilean Primera División players
Segunda División Profesional de Chile players
Segunda División players
Campeonato Brasileiro Série A players
Categoría Primera A players
Primera B de Chile players
Chilean expatriate sportspeople in Spain
Expatriate footballers in Spain
Chilean expatriate sportspeople in Brazil
Expatriate footballers in Brazil
Chilean expatriate sportspeople in Colombia
Expatriate footballers in Colombia